A list of films produced in Russia in 2001 (see 2001 in film).

2001

See also
 2001 in Russia

References

External links
 Russian films of 2001 at the Internet Movie Database

2001
Lists of 2001 films by country or language
Films